Hermann zu Solms-Laubach, more precisely Hermann Maximilian Carl Ludwig Friedrich Graf zu Solms-Laubach (23 December 1842 in Laubach, Grand Duchy of Hesse – 24 November 1915 in Strasbourg) was a German botanist.

Life 
Count Solms-Laubach studied in Giessen, Berlin, Fribourg and Geneva. In 1868 he obtained habilitation at the University of Halle-Wittenberg. In 1872 he became an associate professor at the University of Strasbourg; in 1879 he was appointed  professor and director of the botanical garden in Göttingen, and in 1888 in Strasbourg.

From October 1883 to March 1884 he traveled in Java and stayed for 3 months at Buitenzorg (now Bogor, especially in the botanical garden), West Java and made several collections in the vicinity of Cibodas. He wrote a paper about the Bogor Botanical Gardens that he loved so much.

He was a member of the Linnean Society, the Royal Society, the Geographic Society; and recipient of the Gold Medal of the Linnean Society in 1911.

Work 
His work extended to most branches of botany, especially in systematics and paleontology.
In addition to editing the "Botanische Zeitung" he contributed monographs, among others, on Rafflesiaceae, Caricaceae, Pandanaceae, Hydnoraceae, Chloranthaceae, Lennoaceae and Pontederiaceae to the works of Martius, de Candolle, Engler and Prantl.

The genera Solmsia Baill. (Thymelaeaceae) and Solms-laubachia Muschl. ex Diels (Brassicaceae) were named in his honor.

He is also commemorated in the genus Absolmsia (family Asclepiadaceae) Kuntze.

Bibliography 
 Complete bibliography on WorldCat 
H. zu Solms-Laubach: ‘Der botanische Garten zu Buitenzorg’ (Bot. Zeitung 42, 1884, p. 753-761, 769-780, 785-791).

Sources 
 Based in part on the German version.
 Botanical Gazette 61:432, 1916

References

External links 
 Obituary 

1842 births
1915 deaths
People from Laubach
Hermann
19th-century German botanists
People from the Grand Duchy of Hesse
Foreign Members of the Royal Society